Güzelbahçe is a coastal district of İzmir Province in Turkey. Until 2009 Local Government Elections, Greater İzmir Municipality had 9 district (second-tier) municipalities and Güzelbahçe was one of the smallest district municipality in terms of land area and population. With March 2009 Local Elections, İzmir Greater (Metropolitan) Municipality now have 21 district municipalities, since new municipalities had established due to high population of some major second-tier municipalities like Karşıyaka and Konak. Now, İzmir Greater (Metropolitan) Municipality has several smaller municipalities in terms of land area coverage, however, Güzelbahçe still remains as the smallest municipality within the metropolitan area in terms of population. March 2009 Local Elections of Turkey has also resulted of mergers of villages and town municipalities with their respective second-tier / district municipalities in all greater municipalities. Therefore, parallel to this regulation and changes, Yelki town municipality and Çamlık Villages become part of Güzelbahçe Municipality in 2009. Although the population of Güzelbahçe Municipality increased little, the land area increased greatly. The population and land borders of Güzelbahçe County/District however remained same. Güzelbahçe is part of the İzmir Greater (Metropolitan) Area and Municipality since the establishment of İzmir Greater Municipality in 1984. Although Güzelbahçe seems very urbanized at the rate of 82,7 percent, there are relatively remote villages in the Southern part of the Güzelbahçe Municipality. These villages, like Payamlı, Kavacık, (Kavacık become part of newly established Karabağlar second-tier district municipality in March 2009) are/were part of the Güzelbahçe County/District and famous with their delicious grapes grown on mostly steep hills and mountains. Vineyards during summer and autumns have worth to visits and grapes are definitely worth to taste due to natural growth. Grapes in the vineyards different due to lack of major irrigation or watering.

Güzelbahçe district area follows a section in the southern shore of the inner Gulf of İzmir alongside a narrow coastal strait delimited by mid-height hills. It is İzmir's westernmost district. Güzelbahçe district area further neighbored the district areas of Urla to the west, Menderes (Cumaovası) and Seferihisar to the south and Narlıdere and Karabağlar to the east, this last also being among İzmir's metropolitan districts. The whole The Newest https://web.archive.org/web/20100410202138/http://www.izmir.bel.tr/StandartPages.asp?menuID=1386&MenuName= Starting from March 2009 Local Government Elections of Turkey, the neighboring cities and counties/districts of Güzelbahçe have changed on the Southern and Southwestern part with the establishment of Karabağlar Second-Tier Municipality in 2009.

The district's overall levels of education and income care among the highest in Turkey, the literacy rate reaching 90 per cent, and the average yearly income per inhabitant calculated to be 13.054 US Dollars, as a consequence of the choice of Güzelbahçe as domicile by many among the affluent classes of İzmir in the last decade, who continue to settle in housing projects of villa-type residences built in Güzelbahçe and its dependencies. Construction of luxury homes and settlement by many residents with U.S. or European educational and professional backgrounds resulted in the appearances of American-style suburban living in certain parts of the district. Nevertheless, the subsistence of a part of the population, usually older settlers, is still derived from local activities such as fishing, viniculture, other forms of agriculture -particularly greenhouse cultivation with emphasis on production of decorative plants and flowers- and sections in the district retain their rural character.

Name and administration
Güzelbahçe's administrative history reflects both the rapid pace of transformation in the last eighty years in İzmir and its vicinity and administrative measures and arrangements inspired by momentary considerations. In the first years of the Republic of Turkey, Güzelbahçe was a village depending Urla and was named "Kilizman", a name adopted naturally through history and which makes reference to the ancient city of Klazomenai, located today in Urla quay. In 1936, its population already having exceeded two thousand people, its municipal administration was formed, which still depended Urla at the time, and its name was changed into "Kızılbahçe" (red garden). In 1958, its municipal area was separated from Urla district and was attached to İzmir center, and the name was changed into Güzelbahçe (the beautiful garden) for the first time, reportedly to avoid political connotations associated with the color "Red" at the height of the Cold War. In 1980, the municipality was abolished and the town became an ordinary neighborhood of İzmir. This state of administration was pursued when an İzmir Metropolitan Municipality with depending districts, of which Güzelbahçe is one today, was constituted in 1984. In the phase of administrative changes introduced within İzmir Metropolitan Municipality structure in 1988, Güzelbahçe became part of Konak metropolitan district. In 1992, the two rooted neighborhoods (Güzelbahçe and Narlıdere) which extend along İzmir metropolitan area's western were combined and a new district under the name, "Narlıbahçe" (which gives the meaning, "garden of pomegranates"), a combination based on part of each one's name, was formed. In 1993, both Güzelbahçe and Narlıdere became distinct metropolitan districts under their present names. The name Kilizman is still used by the population for the coastal strait.

There are seven officially constituted neighborhoods in Güzelbahçe and the district center has one depending settlement (Yelki) with its own municipality and around two thousand inhabitants, as well as three depending villages located close, the total population of which slightly exceeds a thousand. Güzelbahçe have present boundaries after giving village of Çamtepe to Seferihisar district according to decree, released in 19 October 2001.

Economy
Both in outlook and in its economy, Güzelbahçe displays particularities of a freshly constituted administrative entity. The total number of residences is 6,510, some of which are seasonal, which leads to variations of around ten thousand people between summer and winter in Güzelbahçe center's constant population of nineteen thousand. Slum-type residences are virtually non-existent in Güzelbahçe. 

The total number of enterprises present in the district is 144. There is one hotel with 40 beds and there are three banks providing services through three branches in Güzelbahçe. On the other hand, figures relating to education present the outlook of a comfortable settlement in this regard, with 13 students for each teacher. The mountains covered with pine forests which mark Güzelbahçe's southern borders and which covers more than one third of the total district area are favorite spots for excursions for the inhabitants of İzmir as a whole, especially during weekends and holidays. Land used for agricultural purposes constitute slightly less than one third of the total district area in Güzelbahçe.

Resources

References

See also 

 Kilizman Martyrdom Monument

İzmir
Populated coastal places in Turkey
Populated places in İzmir Province
Fishing communities in Turkey
Districts of İzmir Province